Zam  is a department or commune of Ganzourgou Province in central-eastern Burkina Faso. Its capital lies at the town of Zam. According to the 1996 census the department has a total population of 39,259.

Towns and villages
 Zam	(1 574 inhabitants) (capital)
 Boulgou	(483 inhabitants)
 Damigoghin	(911 inhabitants)
 Damongto	(1 087 inhabitants)
 Dassimpouigo	(1 071 inhabitants)
 Dawaka	(2 443 inhabitants)
 Gandeongo	(1 447 inhabitants)
 Amdalaye	(296 inhabitants)
 Ipala	(824 inhabitants)
 Komgnesse	(908 inhabitants)
 Kieglesse	(520 inhabitants)
 Koratinga	(1 951 inhabitants)
 Koratinga peulh	(271 inhabitants)
 Kougri	(4 110 inhabitants)
 Kroumweogo	(1 320 inhabitants)
 Lallé	(1 481 inhabitants)
 Nabmalgma	(708 inhabitants)
 Nangbangdré	(786 inhabitants)
 Nahoutinga	(1 782 inhabitants)
 Pissi	(544 inhabitants)
 Pousghin	(949 inhabitants)
 Rapadama peulh	(411 inhabitants)
 Rapadama T	(1 545 inhabitants)
 Sambtinga	(405 inhabitants)
 Song-naaba	(949 inhabitants)
 Talembika	(1 429 inhabitants)
 Toghin	(1 019 inhabitants)
 Toyoko	(1 334 inhabitants)
 Waltinga	(764 inhabitants)
 Wayen-Zam	(1 285 inhabitants)
 Wayen Rapadama	(1 366 inhabitants)
 Weotinga	(1 078 inhabitants)
 Yagma	(609 inhabitants)
 Yarghin	(491 inhabitants)
 Yorgho	(1 108 inhabitants)

References

Departments of Burkina Faso
Ganzourgou Province